Pablo César López Martínez (born 7 January 1998) is a Mexican professional footballer who plays as a midfielder. He was included in The Guardian's "Next Generation 2015".

Club career
López made his Liga MX debut against América on 19 November 2016, and made his Copa MX debut against Atlético San Luis on 17 February 2016.

When midfielder Érick Gutiérrez joined Dutch Eredivisie club PSV Eindhoven in 2018, López became his replacement. He scored his first goal in the professional ranks in September against Guadalajara. He started 20 games overall during the 2018–19 season.

International career

Youth
López was called up for the 2017 FIFA U-20 World Cup.

López was called up by Jaime Lozano to participate with the under-22 team at the 2019 Toulon Tournament, where Mexico won third place. He was called up by Lozano again for the 2019 Pan American Games, with Mexico winning the third-place match.

Honours
Mexico Youth
CONCACAF U-17 Championship: 2015
Pan American Bronze Medal: 2019

References

External links
 
 

1998 births
Living people
Mexican footballers
Mexico under-20 international footballers
Mexico youth international footballers
Association football midfielders
C.F. Pachuca players
Atlético San Luis footballers
Liga MX players
Sportspeople from Querétaro City
Footballers from Querétaro
Pan American Games medalists in football
Pan American Games bronze medalists for Mexico
Footballers at the 2019 Pan American Games
Medalists at the 2019 Pan American Games